Rabbi Yehoshua Rokeach (1825 – February 3, 1894), known as the Mitteler Ruv, was the second Rebbe of the Belz Hasidic dynasty. He combined Torah scholarship with practical common sense to guide thousands of Hasidim and to fight the Haskalah ("Enlightenment") movement that was making inroads in Jewish communities in Poland during the nineteenth century.  His pioneering activities included founding the Machzikei Hadas organization.

Family 
Rabbi Yehoshua Rokeach was the youngest of five sons of Rabbi Sholom Rokeach (the Sar Shalom), founder of the Belz dynasty. His eldest brother was named Elazar. His father was his primary teacher.

Yehoshua married a granddaughter of the Apter Rov and had five sons and four daughters.

Leadership 
The notion of a son succeeding a father as Rebbe was uncommon at that point in the development of the Hasidic movement; usually the Rebbe was succeeded by a close disciple. For two years before his death, the Sar Shalom had spent several hours each day talking with his youngest son and suggesting that he should be his successor. But after the Sar Shalom died, on September 10, 1855, Yehoshua was unwilling to step ahead of his four older brothers to become Rebbe. From 1855 to 1857, Belz Hasidut slowly crumbled without a central leader and many Hasidim defected to other Rebbes. Finally, on Rosh Hashana 1857, Yehoshua decisively grasped the reigns of leadership by entering the central Belz synagogue for the prayer services and seating himself in the rebbe's chair by the eastern wall. He reigned as Rebbe from 1857 to 1894.

Under his leadership the yoshvim (learners) program of Belz expanded significantly. Belz encouraged married men to spend their days immersed in Torah study and prayer in the central Belz synagogue. Their meals and lodgings were provided by local businessmen. Some men remained in the program without returning home for months at a time.

Rokeach led his Hasidim with both deep erudition and common sense. Every Yom Kippur afternoon, for example, he would walk through the aisles of the Belz synagogue, intently scanning the faces of all the worshippers. Those who wondered about this practice were answered when he once spotted someone about to faint from the weakness of the fast. The Rebbe pulled a piece of cake out of his pocket and immediately fed it to the ill man.

Rokeach battled the Haskalah movement that sought to introduce modernity and compromise in the Torah community. He often defended the Torah way of life to the leaders of the Haskalah's Shomer Yisrael organization. On one occasion, a leader of Shomer Yisrael asked him, "It isn’t right to be extreme and keep to the side of Hasidut or to the side of assimilation. What is wrong with taking the middle path?" The Rebbe responded, "Who walks at the side of the road? People! And who goes in the middle? Horses!"

To strengthen Torah Jewry against the inroads of Haskalah, the Rebbe helped found the Machzikei Hadas organization in 1878 and the Machazikei Hadas newspaper, both of which still exist in the Belzer community.

Final months 

In 1894 Rokeach traveled to Vienna to visit a specialist and undergo an operation. The operation was deemed a success, but the Rebbe died on the train en route to Belz a short while later, at the age of 69.

He was succeeded as Rebbe by his second son, Yissachar Dov Rokeach.

Rebbes of Belz
Rabbi Sholom Rokeach (1779–1855)
Rabbi Yehoshua Rokeach (1825–1894)
Rabbi Yissachar Dov Rokeach (1854–1926)
Rabbi Aharon Rokeach (1877–1957)
Rabbi Yissachar Dov Rokeach (b. 1948)

See also
Agudat Israel
Belz (town in Poland/Ukraine)
Belz Beis HaMedrash HaGadol
Belz (Hasidic dynasty)
Machzikei Hadas
Moshe Greenwald
Pupa (Hasidic dynasty)
Yehoshua Rokeach of Machnovka

References

External links
Sefer Petiras Rabbenu HaKadosh MiBelz - in Hebrew - stories about Rabbi Yehoshua Rokeach of Belz - PDF file

 Akiva Padwa, אבי יושב אוהל ומקנה - תולדות חייו של אבי היושבים הגה"ח רבי מרדכי פעלץ (in Hebrew)
 Akiva Padwa, החתונה המפורסמת בטשערנוביל (in Hebrew)
 Torah Treasures of the Second Belzer Rebbe, Rav Yehoshua Rokeach ztâ€l By Rabbi Menachem Pollack -  Dec 11, 2013

1825 births
1894 deaths
Polish Hasidic rabbis
Hasidic rabbis in Europe
Orthodox rabbis from Galicia (Eastern Europe)
Rebbes of Belz